María Maldonado may refer to:

 María José Maldonado (born 1985), Paraguayan singer, model and beauty pageant titleholder
 Maria Maldonado (Miss Kentucky) (born 1982), American beauty pageant titleholder
 María Garfias Maldonado (born 1968), Mexican politician
 María Maldonado (field hockey) (born 1997), Chilean field hockey player